The 2002–03 Divizia C season was the 47th season of Divizia C, the third tier of the Romanian football league system.

Standings

Seria I

Serie II

CS Voluntari retired at the beginning of second part of the championship and lost all the rest of the matches with 3-0
Ambianța Valea-Ciorii retired from championship after round 6 and all its results were canceled
Metalul Băicoi - Turistul Pietroasa (3-1) was homologated with 3-0, because the guests used a suspended player, Zaibert
Tractorul - Proodeftiki (8-0) was awarded 0-3.
Turistul Pietroasa - Poiana Câmpina (1-1) was awarded 3-0, as Ioan Chiția played while under suspension.

Serie III

Petrolul Bolintin - CS Snagov (2-0) was awarded 3-0.
Sportul Ciorogârla - Venus (1-1) was ruled 0-3.
ȘN Tulcea withdrew at half season and lost all games in spring by forfeit.

Serie IV

Pan Serie Craiova became Armata Craiova
Fulgerul Lerești-Progresul Caracal 0-1 was ruled 0-3
Fulgerul Lerești-Școala "Gică Popescu" Calafat was awarded 0-3, Fulgerul was excluded from the league after a second forfeit, and all their results were canceled

Serie V

Metalul Oțelul Roșu - Oltul Slatina (1-1) was awarded 0-3.
Oltul Slatina - Minerul Berbesti (1-1) was ruled 0-3, as Oltul fielded Daniel Uță while under suspension.

Serie VI

Dacia Orastie - CFR Teius (6-1) was ruled 3-0.

Serie VII

Nitramonia - Textila Cisnadie was awarded 3-0. Textila Cisnadie withdrew and lost all games in the second half of the season by forfeit.

Serie VIII

Marmația '96 Sighet withdrew and lost all games in the second half of the season by forfeit.

See also 

 2002–03 Divizia A
 2002–03 Divizia B
 2002–03 Divizia D

References 

Liga III seasons
Rom
2002–03 in Romanian football